Takauji (written: 尊氏 or 高氏) is a masculine Japanese given name. Notable people with the name include:

 (1305–1358), Japanese shōgun
 (1306–1373), Japanese samurai

Japanese masculine given names